Is Your Honeymoon Really Necessary? is a 1944 comedy play by the British writer Vivian Tidmarsh. The title is a reference to the wartime slogan Is Your Journey Really Necessary?.

It ran for 981 performances in its original West End run at the Duke of York's Theatre, lasting from 1 August 1944 to 14 December 1946. The cast included Ralph Lynn, who also directed, and Enid Stamp Taylor.

Film adaptations
A 1947 Swedish film Wedding Night was based on the work. In 1950 the play inspired a German film The Disturbed Wedding Night  starring Curd Jürgens, Ilse Werner and Susanne von Almassy. In 1953 a British adaptation Is Your Honeymoon Really Necessary? was made, starring Bonar Colleano, Diana Dors and David Tomlinson.

References

Bibliography
 Goble, Alan. The Complete Index to Literary Sources in Film. Walter de Gruyter, 1999.
 Wearing, J.P. The London Stage 1940-1949: A Calendar of Productions, Performers, and Personnel.  Rowman & Littlefield, 2014.

1944 plays
Comedy plays
West End plays
Plays set in England
British plays adapted into films